= Black Cat Rebellion =

- Origin: Indianapolis, Indiana, U.S.
- Genre: Punk rock Gothic rock
- Years active: 2003–present
- Labels: Man Della Records, No Front Teeth Records
- Members: Brad St. Patrick; Rob Nüetzmann; Robert Trowbridge; Steve Prince
- Past members: D. Zaster; Michael "Milk" Patton; Ben Galvin; Kurt Fester; Brian Nichols; Patrick Meadows; Chris Grady; Mike West
- Website: www.blackcatrebellion.com

Black Cat Rebellion is an American punk-rooted rock 'n' roll band formed in 2003 in Indianapolis, Indiana, United States, by Brad St. Patrick (vocals and guitars), and Rob Nüetzmann (bass). Many comparisons have been made to their sound, including: 1977 Punk, Garage, Post Punk, and Deathrock.

== Career ==
The band tours frequently, from East to West coast, across the United States. Aside from their own tours, Black Cat has played many festivals; including the Heavy Rebel Weekender, Oranje, and Drop Dead Festival. They have also appeared as the soundtrack to an episode of ESPN 2's "Hot Rod Trucks" show. In print, the band has also appeared in several magazines, including Loud, Fast, Rules, Vive Le Rock, and PORK.

== Discography ==
- Ain't Got No Time – (2004) limited self-release - Out of print
- Our Lives Like Daggers – (2006) Crypt of Blood Records - Out of print
- Lovers Of The Bizarre – (2015) No Front Teeth Records (cd release), Man Della Records (vinyl release)
- Ethereal Twin I – (2020) EP
- Ethereal Twin II – (2021) EP (unreleased)

== Members ==
=== Current ===
- Brad St. Patrick – Vocals and guitar (2003–present)
- Rob Nüetzmann – Bass (2003–2007, 2010–present)
- Robert Trowbridge – Guitar (2018–present)
- Steve Prince – Drums (2017–present)

=== Former ===
- D. Zaster – Drums (2005–2006)
- Michael "Milk" Patton – Drums (2006–2007)
- Ben Galvin (2011–2013)
- Kurt Fester – Bass (2008–2009)
- Brian Nichols – Guitar (2010–2011)
- Patrick Meadows – Guitar (2012–2016)
- Chris Grady – Drums (2003–2006, 2008–2011, 2014–2017)
- Mike West – Guitar (2016–2017)
